Health, Risk & Society is a peer-reviewed academic journal covering all aspects of risk analysis concerning health issues. It was established in 1999 and is published by Taylor & Francis. The editor-in-chief is Patrick Brown from the University of Amsterdam, Netherlands.

Abstracting and indexing 
The journal is abstracted and indexed in:

According to the Journal Citation Reports, the journal has a 2014 impact factor of 1.397.

References

External links 
 

Taylor & Francis academic journals
Public health journals
Publications established in 1999
English-language journals
Health risk
8 times per year journals